Rajiv Kumar may refer to:
 Rajiv Kumar (civil servant) (born 1960), 25th Chief Election Commissioner of India
 Rajiv Kumar (economist) (born 1951), Indian economist
 Rajiv Kumar (cricketer) (born 1976), Indian cricketer

See also 
 Rajeev Kumar (disambiguation)
 Rajive Kumar (born 1958), Indian Administrative Service officer